Raymond Alan Dixon FRS (born 1 December 1947) is a British microbiologist, and Head of department, at John Innes Centre. He was educated at the University of Reading (BSc, 1969) and the University of Sussex (DPhil, 1972).

References

External links
http://www.jic.ac.uk/staff/ray-dixon/
https://scholar.google.com/scholar?hl=en&q=ra+dixon&btnG=Search&as_sdt=0%2C47&as_ylo=&as_vis=0

1947 births
Living people
Alumni of the University of Reading
Alumni of the University of Sussex
Academics of the University of East Anglia
Fellows of the Royal Society
British microbiologists